Friedrich Peter Freiherr Duka von Kádár (Esseg, Slavonia, 1756 - Vienna, Austrian Empire, 29 December 1822) was of Croatian Serb ancestry privy councillor, officer (Feldzeugmeister) and owner of the Hungarian Infantry Regiment No. 39, then State and Conference Council of the Emperor. He was a recipient of the Knight's Cross of the Military Order of Maria Theresa. He is remembered as a great adversary of Napoleon and to have negotiated an armistice with him at Lusigny-sur-Barse.

Biography 
Duka was born in Osijek in 1756 into a Croatian Serb family, while some sources describe him as coming from an Aromanian Serbian Orthodox family. He enrolled in a military college in late 1773. In 1776 Duka joined the 13th Wallachian-Illyrian (Romanian-Serbian) Regiment in Caransebeş as a cadet, but upon graduation, he was transferred to the General Staff as a lieutenant for his obvious abilities, and in 1787 he became a captain.

Appointed major on 1 December 1789, he was transferred to the Coburg Army in the Austrian Netherlands in 1793. After having explored the area extensively for three days before the Battle of Famars, he decided to lead the decisive attack from the main column in four divisions, each led by a reserve artillery battery. He was able to communicate the main objectives to the artillery director Lieutenant Colonel Karl Freiherr von Rouvroy and led the fourth division himself. After further significant deeds in the battles of Berlaimont and Maubeuge, he was rewarded on 1 May 1794 with the promotion to lieutenant colonel and on 7 July 1794 with the Knight's Cross of the Military Order of Maria Theresa. In 1795, as General Wurmser's chief of staff, he planned the successful attack on Mannheim, however, a year later - by now a colonel (24 February 1796) - he lost the Battle of Castiglione.

On 31 May 1798, he was promoted to major general and was assigned to Archduke Charles' military staff in Prague, only to join the general staff in Germany a year later. There he directed Lieutenant Field Marshal Freiherr 's left-wing in the successful defense in the Battle of Stockach.

After he became fortress commander of Temesvar on 5 May 1800, he was promoted to field marshal lieutenant on 14 January 1801 and from March of that year also entrusted by Archduke Charles with the office of the chief of the quartermaster's staff for the armies in Germany and Italy (until April 1805), with the order to begin an army reform which never materialized owing to extenuating circumstances of the time. On 7 October 1803, he became the owner of the Hungarian Infantry Regiment No. 39.

In 1805 Duka was the commanding general in the Banat Military Frontier. He held this office until his death. In 1808 the emperor granted him the rank of baron with the title of Kádár for himself and his legitimate descendants.

On 2 September 1813, Duka rose to the position of Feldzeugmeister and Adjutant General of Emperor Francis II as well as his confidante in military matters. In these capacities, he was sent to Lusigny-sur-Barse to negotiate an armistice with Napoleon.

In Vienna, the emperor finally elevated Duka to the Bohemian baronial class with Inkolat on 22 April 1815, and on 26 July 1816 to the Hungarian baronial class and to the real secret council as well as state and conference council.

Awards 
General Peter Duka was a recipient of numerous decorations, including:

 Knight's Cross of the Military Order of Maria Theresa (1794)
 Grand Cross of the Order of Leopold (1813)
 Army cross for 1813-1814
 Grand Cross of the Royal Bavarian Max Joseph Order (1814)
 Grand Cross of the Ordre royal et militaire de Saint-Louis (1816)
 Royal Prussian Order of the Red Eagle, 1st Class (1813)
 Imperial Russian Order of St. Anne, 1st Class (1813)
 Order of Alexander Nevsky (1813)
 Royal Neapolitan-Sicilian Order of January (1819)

Family 
In 1806, the baron bought the community of Cadăr (pronounced "Kadar") located near the river Pogăniș in Timiș County, three miles south of Timiș Castle. The predicate Kádár in the nobility letter of 1815 refers to this. The 748 inhabitants, spread over 134 houses, were predominantly Romanian speakers and of the Eastern Orthodox denomination under the jurisdiction of the Eparchy of Timișoara at the time. His sons Stephan, Emil, Eugen, and Peter inherited the village after his death. His granddaughter Anastasia (born 31 October 1828 in Belatincz, Zala County, Hungary; died 27 March 1907 in Graz) married Count Vincenz von Logothetti (1824–1886).

Sources
 Jaromir Hirtenfeld: The Military Maria Theresa Order and its members. Volume 1, K. K. Hof- und Staatsdruckerei, Vienna 1857
 Constantin von Wurzbach: Duka, Peter Freiherr von. In: Biographisches Lexikon des Kaiserthums Oesterreich. 3rd part. Typogr.-literar.-artist publishing house. Establishment (L. C. Zamarski, C. Dittmarsch & Comp.), Vienna 1858, p. 389 f. (Digitized version).
 Wilhelm Edler von Janko: Duka, Peter Freiherr von. In: Allgemeine Deutsche Biographie (ADB). Volume 5, Duncker & Humblot, Leipzig 1877, p. 455.
 Duka von Kadar, Friedrich (Peter) Frh .. In: Austrian Biographical Lexicon 1815–1950 (ÖBL). Volume 1, Verlag der Österreichischen Akademie der Wissenschaften, Vienna 1957, p. 203.
 David Hollins: Austrian Commanders of the Napoleonic Wars 1792-1815. Osprey Publishing, Oxford 2004, ISBN 1-84176-664-X.
 Antonio Schmidt-Brentano: Imperial and k. k. Generals (1618-1815). Austrian State Archives / A. Schmidt-Brentano 2006.
 Tötösy de Zepetnek, Steven, ed. Nobilitashungariae: List of Historical Names of the Hungarian Nobility / A magyar történelmi nemesség családneveinek listája. West Lafayette: Purdue University Press, 2010-. http://docs.lib.purdue.edu/clcweblibrary/nobilitashungariae.

See also
 Duka, surname

References 

 Translated and adapted from German Wikipedia: https://de.wikipedia.org/wiki/Peter_Duka_von_K%C3%A1d%C3%A1r

1756 births
1822 deaths
Serbs of Croatia
Austrian generals
Austrian Empire military personnel of the Napoleonic Wars
Austrian Empire military personnel of the French Revolutionary Wars
Knights Cross of the Military Order of Maria Theresa